Ghazala Firdous Hashmi (born July 5, 1964) is an Indian-born American politician and former academic administrator and educator. A Democrat, Hashmi represents the 10th district in the Senate of Virginia; She worked as an educator and academic administrator for 25 years before running for office.

Early life and education 
Hashmi was born in Hyderabad, India, in 1964 to Tanveer and Zia Hashmi. She lived at her maternal grandparents' home in Malakpet during her childhood. Her maternal grandfather served in the finance department of the Government of Andhra Pradesh. Her family moved to the United States in 1969.

Hashmi completed a B.A. in English at Georgia Southern University where she was a member of the honors program. She earned a Ph.D. in English from Emory University on a full scholarship. Her 1992 dissertation was titled William Carlos Williams and the American ground of "In the American Grain" and "Paterson."

Career 
Hashmi was an educator and academic administrator for 25 years. She received awards and medals for diversity, inclusion, and multicultural enrichment as an administrator at J. Sargeant Reynolds Community College where she served as the founding director of the center for excellence in teaching and learning. In the 2019 Virginia Senate election, Hashmi won Virginia's 10th Senate district, defeating incumbent Republican Glen Sturtevant. She is the first Muslim elected to the Senate of Virginia. She was officially sworn into office on January 8, 2020.

Personal life 
Hashmi moved to Richmond in 1991 with her husband. They have two daughters. Hashmi resides in Midlothian, Virginia. Her father is an academic.

Electoral history

2019 election 
{| class="wikitable"
|-
! Date !! Election !! Candidate !! Party !! Votes !! %
|-
! colspan="6" | Virginia Senate, 10th district
|-
! rowspan="6" | November 5, 2019
| rowspan="6" align="center" | General
| Glen H. Sturtevant Jr.
|  | Republican
| align="right" | 36,811
| align="right" | 45.60
|-
| Ghazala Hashmi
|  | Democratic
| align="right" | 43,806
| align="right" | 54.30
|-
|-
| colspan="2" | Write Ins
| align="right" | 49
| align="right" | 0.01
|-}}

References

External links
 
 
 

Living people
Place of birth missing (living people)
Georgia Southern University alumni
Emory University alumni
American academic administrators
Women academic administrators
Indian emigrants to the United States
American politicians of Indian descent
Asian-American people in Virginia politics
Democratic Party Virginia state senators
20th-century American educators
21st-century American educators
21st-century American women politicians
21st-century American politicians
Women state legislators in Virginia
American Muslims
Academics from Virginia
American women academics
Politicians from Hyderabad, India
Women educators from Telangana
20th-century American women educators
1964 births
21st-century American women educators